Carlos Nieto Herrero (born 6 May 1996) is a Spanish footballer who plays for Real Zaragoza. Mainly a left back, he also plays as a central defender or midfielder.

Football career
Born in Zaragoza, Nieto graduated from local Real Zaragoza's youth setup, and made his senior debuts with the reserves in the 2013–14 campaign, while still a junior, in Tercera División. In the 2014 summer he was definitely promoted to the B-team, now in Segunda División B.

On 14 September 2014 Nieto played his first match as a professional, starting in a 1–1 home draw against CE Sabadell FC in the Segunda División championship. He would resume his spell mainly with the B-side in the following campaigns, achieving promotion from Tercera División in 2017.

On 1 August 2018, Nieto extended his contract until 2022 and was definitely promoted to the main squad.

References

External links
Zaragoza official profile 

1996 births
Living people
Footballers from Zaragoza
Spanish footballers
Association football defenders
Segunda División players
Segunda División B players
Tercera División players
Real Zaragoza B players
Real Zaragoza players